Allenolic acid, or allenoic acid, is a synthetic, nonsteroidal estrogen discovered in 1947 or 1948 that, although studied clinically, was never marketed. It is an open-ring or seco-analogue of steroidal estrogens like estrone and equilenin. The compound was named after Edgar Allen, one of the pioneers in estrogen research. Although described as an estrogen, allenolic acid probably is totally inactive at the receptor, whereas a derivative, allenestrol (α,α-dimethyl-β-ethylallenolic acid), is reported to be a potent estrogen. Another derivative of allenolic acid (specifically 6-methoxy-allenestrol), methallenestril (brand name Vallestril), is also a potent estrogen and, in contrast to allenolic acid and allenestrol, has been marketed.

See also 
 Bisdehydrodoisynolic acid
 Doisynoestrol
 Doisynolic acid

References 

2-Naphthols
Propionic acids
Synthetic estrogens